Griva, also known as Vojvodino, Vojvodino, što si tako ravna (trans. Vojvodina, Vojvodina, Why Are You so Flat) after its biggest hit, is the third studio album by Serbian and former Yugoslav hard rock band Griva, released in 1987.

The album featured more commercial sound than previous two Griva albums, and some songs featured elements of folk music of Vojvodina. The track "Devojka biserne kose" is a cover of the song "Gyöngyhajú lány" by the Hungarian band Omega (both Serbian and Hungarian title are translated as "A Girl with Pearls Hair").

Track listing
All songs written by Zlatko Karavla, except where noted
"Vojvodino, Vojvodino, što si tako ravna" - 3:35
"Februar je mesec u znalu mačora" - 3:55
"Kad me ostaviš i zaboraviš" - 2:50
"Devojka biserne kose" (Gábor Presser, Laslo Novak) - 5:00
"Istanbul" (Josip Sabo) - 2:55
"I noćas ću ti noći" - 4:00
"Još mislim na nju" - 3:25
"Mi vas volimo" - 3:05
"Sam protiv svih" - 3:28

Credits
Zlatko Karavla - vocals
Josip Sabo - guitar, backing vocals
Đorđe Jovanvić - bass guitar
Zoran Bulatović - guitar, bass guitar
Nasko Budimlić - drums
Laslo Novak - keyboards
Janoš Kazimić - drums

Additional personnel
Saša Lokner - keyboards
Predrag Janjičić - drums
Ivan Sabo - cello
Brothers Sabo Tamburitza Orchestra
Karolj Kovač - producer
Ivica Vlatković - producer
Jan Šaš - recorded by
Milan Ćirić - recorded by

References 
Griva at Discogs
 EX YU ROCK enciklopedija 1960-2006,  Janjatović Petar;

External links 
Griva at Discogs

Griva albums
1987 albums
Jugodisk albums